Marla Hiromi Hayakawa Salas (October 19, 1982 – September 27, 2017), known professionally as Hiromi Hayakawa, was a Japanese-born Mexican actress and singer who began her music career as a contestant in the reality show La Academia. She worked mostly in musical theatre, however she has had occasional television roles. Hayakawa was also a voice actress, who worked primarily on the Spanish American dub of films and series from the United States.

Early life
Hayakawa was born in Fukuoka to Alfonso Javier Hayakawa, who is of Japanese descent and a native of Torreón, Coahuila, and Lourdes Elsa Salas, from the city of Chihuahua, making her of Japanese and Mexican descent. Her parents resided in Fukuoka while her father studied Industrial Engineering there. They returned to Mexico when Hiromi was only two years old, and at the time, her mother was pregnant with her second child, Kaori.

Career

La Academia
When she attended a casting call for La Academia, Hayakawa scored 9.7 points out of a possible ten points. Though, before competing in La Academia, Hayakawa studied Industrial Engineering and Systems at the Monterrey Institute of Technology and Higher Education in Coahuila. She decided to attend the casting for La Academia because, as with most people who attend the castings, she saw it as a chance of pursuing a musical career.

Hayakawa left La Academia after the thirteenth concert; though she was later re-cast and became the sixth runner-up as the winner. The last song she sang as an official contestant was "La Playa" by La Oreja de Van Gogh. Two weeks after her expulsion, Hayakawa was given the opportunity to return to La Academia and become a finalist. Hayakawa and two other ex-students (Ricardo Hernández Quiñones and Dulce Lopez Rodriguez) were given a song which they had to perform in the next concert. The public would then vote on who they wanted to return to the finale instead of voting on who was going to be expelled. In the end Dulce Lopez Rodriguez won and went to the finale where she won 2nd place. One of the judges, Lolita Cortez, was very disappointed in the results.

Theater
Hayakawa is best known for her work on Mentiras: The Musical, based on the pop culture and music of the 1980s. She has played all of the main roles: Daniela, Dulce, Lupita, Yuri, Emmanuel and Manoella.

She is also known for her role as Mulan in 12 Princesas en Pugna, a satirical take on the Disney Princesses. Hayakawa has also worked on the Mexican adaptations of Peter Pan and Hairspray.

Voice acting
In 2012, she voiced Merida, the protagonist of Pixar's Brave, for the Spanish American dub. She also was Sonata Dusk from Hasbro's Equestria Girls: Rainbow Rocks, Draculaura from Monster High, Bunny Blanc and Ginger Breadhouse from Ever After High.

Personal life
In 2004, Hiromi Hayakawa participated in La Academia, she had a relationship with her ex-generation partner Carlos Rivera.

Hiromi Hayakawa was married to Fernando Santana from January 4, 2017 to September 27, 2017. Hayakawa had a daughter with Santana: Julieta Santana Hayakawa (Mexico City, Mexico, September 26, 2017 – Mexico City, Mexico, September 26, 2017).

Death
Hayakawa was expecting a baby, due on October 21, 2017. On September 26, she was rushed to a hospital and was discovered to have bleeding in the liver. Efforts were made to save the child, named Julieta, but she died at around 11:00 pm. Hayakawa died before noon, the following day. She was 34. On September 28, Hayakawa and Julieta were cremated, and the ashes will remain in Mexico City with her husband.

Filmography

Television
 El Chema
 La Academia
 
 La vida es una canción
 Lo que callamos las mujeres
 A cada quien su santo
 Barrio Bravo (television film)

Voice acting
Hayakawa has worked on the Spanish American dubs of:

Television series
 My Babysitter's a Vampire – Sarah 
 A.N.T. Farm – Jeanne / Vanessa 
 Glee – Sugar Motta (Vanessa Lengies)
 Melrose Place – Abby Douglas 
 Green Balloon Club – Lily Rose
 Zeke and Luther – Cherlene
 Sonny with a Chance – Payton
 Fimbles – Pom

Films
 Alicia a través del espejo – Alicia (2016)
 My Babysitter's a Vampire – Sarah (2010)
 Harriet the Spy: Blog Wars – Marion Hawthorne (2010)
 Geek Charming – Hannah
 Los Muppets – Miss Piggy's receptionist (2011)
 Prom (Fin de curso) – Nova (2011)
 En la boda de mi hermana – Joan (2010)
 Alicia en el país de las maravillas – Alicia (2010)
 Skyrunners – Julie Gunn (2009)
 Mi Falso Prometido – Courtney (2009)
 Cita a ciegas – additional voices

Animated series
 Pokémon – Caitlin / additional voices (season 15)
 Jungla Sobre Ruedas – Zooter
 Barbie: Life in the Dreamhouse – Teresa (from season 2)
 Futurama – additional voices
 El Principito – Linéa
 Los Simpson – Gina Vendetti, Jenny, Nikki McKenna (season 24)
 Twinkle Toes  – Prett Tall
 Stitch – Ángel
 Wibbly Pig – Scruffy pig
 Tellytales – Narrator
 Pearly – Ópalo
 Grojband – Mina Beff
 Los 7E – Reina Delicia
 Rescue Heroes – Ariel Flyer

Animated films
 La increíble historia del Niño de Piedra (2015) – additional voices
 Brave (Valiente) – Princesa Mérida
 Gnomeo y Julieta – Julieta
 Monster High: Una fiesta Tenebrosa – Draculaura
 Barbie: El secreto de las hadas – Taylor
 Barbie: Moda mágica en París – Delphine
 Barbie y las tres mosqueteras – Guest 1
 Los fantasmas de Scrooge – Martha Cratchit
 Lorax. En busca de la trúfula perdida – additional voices
 Barbie: Escuela de Princesas – Isla
 Barbie en una aventura de sirenas – Sirena Destino
 Barbie: La princesa y la estrella de pop – Barbie / Estrella de Pop Keira
 Cars 2 – additional voices
 My Little Pony: Equestria Girls – Rainbow Rocks – Sonata Dusk

References

External links
 La Academia Website 
 

1982 births
2017 deaths
Mexican women singers
Mexican television actresses
Mexican voice actresses
Mexican musicians
Mexican people of Japanese descent
Actresses of Japanese descent
Singers from Coahuila
Actresses from Coahuila
People from Torreón
21st-century Mexican actresses
People from Fukuoka
Deaths from liver failure
Deaths from bleeding
Deaths in childbirth
Japanese emigrants to Mexico